Haleh (also spelled Hale) is a Persian and Turkish feminine given name. It is the Persian form of Hala, an Arabic word that refers to the halo around the moon. People with the name include:

 Haleh Afshar, British professor 
 Haleh Esfandiari, Iranian American academic
 Haleh Jamali, Iranian artist
 Haleh Sahabi, Iranian humanitarian and democracy activist
 Hale Soygazi, Turkish film actress

Iranian feminine given names
Turkish feminine given names